The Museum of Fine Arts (MSK) an art museum in Ghent, Belgium, is situated at the East side of the Citadelpark (near the Stedelijk Museum voor Actuele Kunst).

The museum's collection consists of some 9000 artworks, dating from the Middle Ages to the 20th century. Over 600 works can be found on display permanently, with the collection largely focusing on Flemish Art (Southern Netherlands). It also houses several European- especially French- paintings, in addition to a large amount of sculptures.

Next to its permanent collection the museum organises temporary exhibitions. Between March 2011 and January 2021, the museum conducted 41 exhibitions.

The building was designed by city architect Charles van Rysselberghe around 1900.

In 2007 the museum reopened after four years of restoration.

The museum is a member of The Flemish Art Collection. This is a structural partnership joining the three main museums of fine arts in Flanders: Royal Museum of Fine Arts, the Groeninge Museum in Bruges and the Ghent Museum of Fine Arts. The museums’ collections have all been developed in a similar way and complement each other perfectly. Together, they offer a unique, representative overview of Flemish art from the 15th to the 20th century.
As partners sharing the same responsibility in Belgian cultural heritage, the three museums exchange their expertise, they strive for a more sustainable, high quality management and international awareness of their collections, including works that are part of the world patrimony.

Paintings

Source:  MSK 
 Josse Sébastien van den Abeele - Self Portrait (19th century)  MSK
 Abraham van Beijeren - Still Life with Fish (1666) MSK
 Frits Van den Berghe - The Singing Statue (1928) MSK
 Pieter de Bloot - Landscape with a Farmhouse  (c.1645) MSK
 Jan Boeckhorst - Apollo and Python (17th century) MSK
 Hieronymus Bosch - St. Jerome at Prayer (c.1485) MSK
 Anna Boch - Cliffs on the Coast of Sanary (1936) MSK
 Hieronymus Bosch - Christ Carrying the Cross (c.1510) MSK
 Ferdinand De Braekeleer the Elder - The Bat (1860) MSK
 Jan de Bray - Portrait of a Young Woman (c.1665) MSK 
 Pieter Brueghel the Younger - Wedding Dance in the Open Air (17th century) MSK
 Emile Claus - The Skaters (1891) MSK
 Gaspar de Crayer - The Judgement of Solomon (c.1620) MSK
 Paul Delvaux - The Staircase (1946) MSK
 Gustave Den Duyts - Panoramic View of Ghent (c.1881) MSK
 Anthony van Dyck - Jupiter and Antiope (c.1620) MSK
 Henri Evenepoel - The Spaniard in Paris /Portrait of the Painter Francisco Iturrino (1899) MSK 
 James Ensor - Children at their Morning Toilet  (1886) MSK
 Léon Frédéric - The Funeral Meal (1886)  MSK
 Heinrich Funk - Landscape at Dusk in Tyrol  (1847) MSK
 Théodore Géricault - Portrait of a Kleptomaniac (c.1820) MSK'
 Jan Pauwel Gillemans the Elder - Still Life with Vegetables and Fruits MSK
 James Guthrie - Schoolmates (1884) MSK
 Cornelis de Heem - Still Life with Flowers and Fruits (1670) MSK
 Maarten van Heemskerck - Man of Sorrows (1532) MSK
 Maarten van Heemskerck - Calvary (1543) MSK
 Jacob Jordaens - The Judgement of Midas (17th century) MSK
 Fernand Khnopff - Incense (1898) MSK
 Urbanus Leyniers - The Glorification of Apollo (1717) MSK
 Léon Augustin Lhermitte - The Grandmother (1880) MSK 
 Nicolaes Maes - Portrait of a Woman (1663) MSK
 Alessandro Magnasco Praying Monks (18th century) MSK
 René Magritte - Perspective II, Manet's Balcony  (1950) MSK
 Harrington Mann - Kathleen (1906) MSK
 Adolf Meckel von Hemsbach - The St Catherine Monastery in the Sinai (19th century) MSK
 Paula Modersohn-Becker - Girl in a Birch Forest (1903) MSK
 Jenny Montigny - The Gardener (20th Century) MSK
 Joseph Paelinck - The Beautiful Anthia Leading her Companions into the Temple of Diana in Ephesus (1820) MSK
 Fanny Paelinck-Horgnies - The Saint Cecilia (1829) MSK
 Constant Permeke - Ostend Harbour (c.1913) MSK
 Nicolas de Plattemontagne - Portrait of a Young Man  (17th century) MSK
 Ramah - The Painter (1922) MSK
 Hubert van Ravesteyn - Still Life with a Pipe, Nuts, a Pitcher and a Tobacco Pouch (1670) MSK
 Petrus Johannes van Reysschoot - The Meet (1743) MSK
 Peter Paul Rubens - The Flagellation of Christ (1617) MSK
 Peter Paul Rubens - Saint Francis Receiving the Stigmata (c.1633) MSK
 Théo van Rysselberghe - The Lecture by Emile Verhaeren, 1903 (1903) MSK
 Theodoor Rombouts - Allegory of the Five Senses  (1632) MSK
 Theodoor Rombouts - Allegory of the Second Bench of Aldermen of ‘Gedele’ (c.1627) MSK
 Hugo Salmson - Visiting the Tenant Farmer (19th century) MSK
 Gustave De Smet - The Good House (1926) MSK
 Leon De Smet - Interior or A Loving Couple (1911) MSK
 Léon Spilliaert - Silhouette of the Artist (1907) MSK
 Léon Spilliaert - The Second of November (Interior) (1908) MSK
 Alfred Stevens - Mary-Magdalene (1887) MSK
 Tintoretto - Portrait of Giovanni Paolo Cornaro (1561) MSK
 Prosper de Troyer - With the Birds (1928) MSK
 Edgard Tytgat - Invitation to Paradise (1922) MSK 
 Edgard Tytgat - The Last Doll (1923) MSK
 Edgard Tytgat - Four Nude Girls in a Boat (1950) MSK
 Lodewijk de Vadder - The Soignes Forest with Market Vendors  (17th century) MSK
 Frans Verhas - The Lion (1874) MSK
 Pierre Joseph Verhaghen - The Presentation of Christ in the Temple (1767) MSK
 Cornelis de Vos - Family Portrait (1630) MSK
 Anna De Weert - My Studio in June, 1909-1910 (1909–10) MSK
 Liévin De Winne - Portrait of the Sculptor Paul De Vigne  (19th century) MSK
 Gustave Van de Woestyne  - Still Life (c.1922) MSK
Carel Willink Het evenwicht der krachten Equilibrium of forces (1963)
 Anders Zorn - With Mother (1895) MSK

See also
 Stedelijk Museum voor Actuele Kunst 
 Royal Museum of Fine Arts
 Royal Museums of Fine Arts of Belgium

References

External links
 official website 
The Flemish Art Collection

Museum of Fine Arts, Ghent

Museums in Ghent